The John Deere Pavilion is a landmark located in Moline, Illinois.  The pavilion opened in 1997 as part of an urban renewal project. The Pavilion serves as the official visitor center for John Deere, whose world headquarters are located a few miles away.  As well as being the visitor center to John Deere, the pavilion houses the largest retail store for John Deere merchandise.

Opened in 1997, the pavilion has drawn over 150,000 visitors annually.  It is one of the top attractions in the region and contributed directly to the development of other corporate visitor centers such as Coca-Cola and Caterpillar Inc. The pavilion is free to enter and full of activities for all ages. Exhibits include interactives and both new and historical equipment to climb in and explore.

See also
Quad Cities Landmarks

References

External links
 

Farm museums in Illinois
John Deere
Buildings and structures in Moline, Illinois
Museums in Rock Island County, Illinois
Tourist attractions in Rock Island County, Illinois